Pandemis quadrata is a species of moth of the family Tortricidae. It is found in China (Shanxi).

The length of the forewings is 9–10 mm. The forewings are light brown, with a scattered brown pattern. The hindwings are greyish brown.

References

	

Moths described in 1983
Pandemis